Hirbandh is a village in the Hirbandh CD block in the Khatra subdivision of the Bankura district  in the state of West Bengal, India.

Geography

Location

Area overview
The map alongside shows the Khatra subdivision of Bankura district. Physiographically, this area is having uneven lands with hard rocks. In the Khatra CD block area there are some low hills. The Kangsabati project reservoir is prominently visible in the map. The subdued patches of shaded area in the map show forested areas It is an almost fully rural area.

Note: The map alongside presents some of the notable locations in the subdivision. All places marked in the map are linked in the larger full screen map.

Demographics
According to the 2011 Census of India, Hirbandh had a total population of 1,733 of which 859 (50%) were males and 874 (50%) were females. Population below 6 years was 175. The total number of literates in Hirbandh was 1,128 (72.40% of the population over 6 years).

.*For language details see Hirbandh (community development block)#Language and religion

Civic administration

Police station
Hirbandh police station has jurisdiction over the Hirbandh  CD block. The area covered is 215.80 km2 with a population of 72,502.

CD block HQ
The headquarters of Hirbandh CD block are located at Hirbandh.

Transport
State Highway 4 running from Jhalda (in Purulia district) to Digha foreshore (in Purba Medinipur district) pass through Hirbandh.

Education
Hirbandh High School is a Bengali-medium coeducational institution established in 1942. It has facilities for teaching from class V to class XII. The school has 10 computers and a library with 3,000 books. This is one of the fourteen schools in Bankura district in which the opening of an Olchiki medium section (for Santali language) from class V was sanctioned in 2012.

Deulgora Bhuakana P.P.A. High School at Hirbandh is a Bengali-medium coeducational institution established in 1962. It has facilities for teaching from class V to class XII. The school has 1 computer, a library with 100 books and a playground.

Healthcare
Amjhuri (Hirbandh) Rural Hospital, with 30 beds at Hirbandh, is the major government medical facility in the Hirbandh CD block. There are primary health centres at Mosiara (Dharampur) (with 4 beds) and Molian (Shyamnagar) (with 10 beds).

References

Villages in Bankura district